Park Kyung-mo (born August 15, 1975) is an archer from South Korea. He has won gold medals at the three major World Archery Federation events (Olympics, World Archery Championships and World Cup finals) and is a former world number one.

He is married to archer Park Sung-hyun.

2004 Summer Olympics
Park competed for Korea at the 2004 Summer Olympics in men's individual archery.  He won his first three elimination matches, advancing to the quarterfinals.  In the quarterfinals, Park faced Tim Cuddihy of Australia, losing to the eventual bronze medalist 112-111 in the 12-arrow match. Park placed 5th overall and holds the Olympic record for an 18-arrow match at 70 meters.  He scored 173 points out of the potential 180 to set the record. He was also a member of Korea's gold medal men's archery team at the 2004 Summer Olympics.

2008 Summer Olympics
At the 2008 Summer Olympics in Beijing Park finished his ranking round with a total of 676 points, three points behind leader Juan René Serrano. This gave him the fourth seed for the final competition bracket in which he faced Luiz Trainini in the first round, beating the Brazilian 116-99. In the second round Park was too strong for Kuo Cheng Wei (111-110) and via Rafał Dobrowolski (113-105) in the third round he advanced to the quarter finals. There he and Juan Carlos Stevens both came to 108 points and an extra round was needed. Here Park scored 19 points and Stevens 17, which brought Park into the semi final, in which he was too strong for ranking round winner Serrano. In the final he came one point too short to equal Viktor Ruban for the gold and had to be satisfied with the silver medal, 113-112.

Together with Lee Chang-Hwan and Im Dong-Hyun he also took part in the team event. With his 676 score from the ranking round combined with the 670 of Im and the 669 of Lee the Koreans were in first position after the ranking round, which gave them a straight seed into the quarter finals. With 224-222 they were too strong for the Polish team and in the semi final they beat home nation China 221-218. In the final Italy came close, but South Korea took the title with 227-225.

See also
Korean archery
Archery
List of South Korean archers

References

1975 births
Living people
South Korean male archers
Archers at the 2004 Summer Olympics
Archers at the 2008 Summer Olympics
Olympic archers of South Korea
Olympic gold medalists for South Korea
Olympic silver medalists for South Korea
Olympic medalists in archery
Asian Games medalists in archery
Medalists at the 2008 Summer Olympics
Archers at the 1994 Asian Games
Archers at the 2006 Asian Games
Medalists at the 2004 Summer Olympics
Asian Games gold medalists for South Korea
Medalists at the 1994 Asian Games
Medalists at the 2006 Asian Games
South Korean Buddhists
20th-century South Korean people
21st-century South Korean people